South Ossett is the south part of the town of Ossett, in West Yorkshire, England. The north part is known as 'Ossett and Gawthorpe'.

South Ossett is just north of Horbury with the main road of Storrs Hill Road. It is historically the least industrialised part of the town. Much of the new building growth in Ossett has been concentrated in the South Ossett area. About 25% of Ossett's population is within the South Ossett area. The town is next to countryside and is part of the Wakefield  constituency and "Horbury and South Ossett" ward for elections.

Two schools are located on Storrs Hill Road: Ossett Comprehensive High School and St. Ignatius Catholic Primary School. The former is Ossett's only remaining high school. Previously there was a North Ossett School. The current Ossett school was previously Ossett Grammar School, where the author Stan Barstow educated during the war.

South Ossett contains St Ignatius Church and parish centre. The parish centre provides for most people from South Ossett to cast their vote each year.

See also
Listed buildings in Horbury and South Ossett

Ossett